Muriicola jejuensis is a Gram-negative bacterium from the genus of Muriicola which has been isolated from seawater from the coast of Jeju Island.

References

Flavobacteria
Bacteria described in 2010